The Cuban dissident movement is a political movement in Cuba whose aim is to replace the current government with a liberal democracy. According to Human Rights Watch, the Cuban government represses nearly all forms of political dissent.

Background

1959 Cuban Revolution
Fidel Castro came to power with the Cuban Revolution of 1959. By the end of 1960, according to Paul H. Lewis in Authoritarian Regimes in Latin America, all opposition newspapers had been closed down and all radio and television stations were under state control.

Homosexuals as well as other "deviant" groups who were excluded from military conscription, were forced to conduct their compulsory military service in work camps called "Military Units to Aid Production" in the 1960s, and were subjected to political "reeducation". Some of Castro's military commanders brutalized the inmates.

In nearly all areas of government, loyalty to the regime became the primary criterion for all appointments.

Government authority
 The media is operated under the Cuban Communist Party’s Department of Revolutionary Orientation, which "develops and coordinates propaganda strategies".
 A Human Rights Watch 1999 report on Cuba notes that Cuba has penalties for anyone who "threatens, libels or slanders, defames, affronts (injuria) or in any other way insults (ultraje) or offends, with the spoken word or in writing, the dignity or decorum of an authority, public functionary, or his agents or auxiliaries". There are even harsher penalties for those who show contempt for the President of the Council of the State, the President of the National Assembly of Popular Power, the members of the Council of the State or the Council of Ministers, or the Deputies of the National Assembly of the Popular Power.
 There is a three-month to one-year sentence for anyone who "publicly defames, denigrates, or scorns the Republic's institutions, the political, mass, or social organizations of the country, or the heroes or martyrs of the nation".
 Cubans are not allowed to produce, distribute or store publications without informing the authorities.
 Social dangerousness, defined as violations of socialist morality, can warrant "pre-criminal measures" and "therapeutic measures".
 Regarding institutions, the Human Rights Watch report notes that the Interior Ministry has principal responsibility for monitoring the Cuban population for signs of dissent.
 In 1991, two new mechanisms for internal surveillance and control emerged. Communist Party leaders organized the Singular Systems of Vigilance and Protection (Sistema Unico de Vigilancia y Protección, SUVP). Rapid Action Brigades (Brigadas de Acción Rapida, also referred to as Rapid Response Brigades, or Brigadas de Respuesta Rápida) observe and control dissidents. The regime also "maintains academic and labor files (expedientes escolares y laborales) for each citizen, in which officials record actions or statements that may bear on the person's loyalty to the regime. Before advancing to a new school or position, the individual's record must first be deemed acceptable".

Situation today

In 2017, Cuba was described as one of only two "authoritarian regimes" in the Americas by The Economist'''s 2017 Democracy Index. The island had the second highest number of imprisoned journalists in the world in 2008, second only to the People's Republic of China, according to the Committee to Protect Journalists (CPJ), an international press organization.
The military of Cuba is a central organization; it controls 60 percent of the economy and is Raúl Castro's base.

According to a paper published in the Harvard International Review, dissident groups are weak and infiltrated by Cuban state security. Media is totally state-controlled. Dissidents find it difficult to organize and "Many of their leaders have shown enormous courage in defying the regime. Yet, time and again, the security apparatus has discredited or destroyed them. They do not represent a major threat to the regime."
 	

The paper Can Cuba Change? in the National Endowment for Democracy's Journal of Democracy states that about nine-tenths of the populace forms an economically and politically oppressed underclass and "Using the principles of democracy and human rights to unite and mobilize this vast, dispossessed majority in the face of a highly repressive regime is the key to peaceful change". Working people are a critical source of discontent. The only legal trade union is controlled by the government and strikes are banned. Afro-Cuban dissidents have also risen, fueled by racism in Cuba.

In 2012, Amnesty International warned that repression of Cuban dissidents was on the rise over the past two years, citing the Wilmar Villar hunger strike death, as well as the arrests of prisoners of conscience Yasmin Conyedo Riveron, Yusmani Rafael Alvarez Esmori, and Antonio Michel and Marcos Máiquel Lima Cruz. The Cuban Commission of Human Rights reported that there were 6,602 detentions of government opponents in 2012, up from 4,123 in 2011.

Dissident groups
There are a number of opposition parties and groups that campaign for political change in Cuba. Though amendments to the Cuban Constitution of 1992 decriminalized the right to form political parties other than the Communist Party of Cuba, these parties are not permitted to engage in public political activities on the island.

 Alpha 66, an organization that targets the Cuban government of Fidel Castro.
 Christian Liberation Movement, a movement and group of Catholics that was founded by Oswaldo Payá.
 Ladies in White received the Sakharov Prize for Freedom of Thought from the European Parliament in 2005.
 Lawton Foundation, a organization to promote the "study, defense, and denunciation of human rights inside Cuba". The group was formed by Oscar Elías Biscet.
 Cuban Democratic Directorate, a non-governmental organization aligned with the Centrist Democrat International and International Democratic Union.
 Omega 7, a small terrorist group that operated against the Cuban government from the 1960s to the 1980s.
 Patriotic Union of Cuba – Founded by José Daniel Ferrer, a former member of the Christian Liberation Movement, it has defined itself as a civic organization that advocates for a peaceful but firm fight against any repression of civil liberties in the Republic of Cuba.
 Rosa Parks Feminist Movement for Civil Rights
 San Isidro Movement, a group of writers, artists, academics and journalists protesting restriction on freedom of expression, beginning in 2018.
 Varela Project, an organization reported to have collected more than 10,000 signatures for a referendum requesting freedom of the press, freedom of political association, and freedom to create private business in Cuba. According to Amnesty International, their methods were non-violent, and their philosophy was democratic. The government responded with its own petition drive to make the socialist system "untouchable", for which the government claimed 99% voter approval. Fidel Castro said that, "The revolutionary process of socialism cannot be reversed" and "Cuba will never return to capitalism".
 Yo No Coopero Con La Dictadura, a civil resistance organization.

Dissidents
Black Spring
During the "Black Spring" in 2003, the regime imprisoned 75 dissidents, including 29 journalists. Their cases were reviewed by Amnesty International who officially adopted them as prisoners of conscience. To the original list of 75 prisoners of conscience resulting from the wave of arrests in spring 2003, Amnesty International added four more dissidents in January 2004. They had been arrested in the same context as the other 75 but did not receive their sentences until much later. These prisoners have since been released in the face of international pressure. Tripartite talks between the Cuban government, the Catholic Church in Cuba and the Spanish government were initiated in spring 2010 in reaction to the controversial death of political prisoner Orlando Zapata Tamayo in February 2010 following a hunger strike amid reports of massive abuse at the hands of prison staff. These negotiations resulted in a July 2010 agreement that all remaining prisoners of the 'Group of 75' would be freed. Spain offered to receive those prisoners who would agree to be released and immediately exiled together with their families. Of the 79 prisoners of conscience 56 were still behind bars at the time of the agreement. Of the total group, 21 are still living in Cuba today whereas the others are in exile, most of them in Spain. The final two prisoners were released on 23 March 2011.

Notable people

 Manuel Vázquez Portal, a poet, writer, and a journalist, received the 2003 CPJ International Press Freedom Award.
 Héctor Maseda Gutiérrez, a jailed nuclear engineer and journalist, received the 2008 CPJ International Press Freedom Award.
 Jorge Luis García Pérez (known as Antúnez) was jailed for criticizing communism and spent 17 years in jail until released in 2007. As the longest-serving jailed black dissident when he was released, he has been referred to as Cuba's Nelson Mandela. Nelson Mendela, on the other hand, was an outspoken supporter of the Cuban Revolution and Fidel Castro, crediting him with the liberation of his country.
Jorge Mas Canosa (1939-1997), founder of the Cuban American National Foundation
Jesús Permuy, human rights activist, founder of the Human Rights Center of Miami
 Gorki Águila, musician 
 Jose Luis Llovio-Menendez, bureaucrat, defected in 1981.
 Rafael del Pino Díaz, Brigadier General. Highest government official to have defected so far, in 1987

Independent bloggers

The Foreign Policy magazine named Yoani Sánchez one of the 10 Most Influential Intellectuals of Latin America, the only woman on the list. An article in El Nuevo Herald by Ivette Leyva Martinez, speaks to the role played by Yoani Sanchez and other young people, outside the Cuban opposition and dissidence movements, in working towards a free and democratic Cuba today:

On 29 March 2009, at Tania Bruguera's performance where a podium with an open mic was staged for people to have one minute of uncensored public speech, Sánchez was among people to publicly criticize censorship in Cuba and said that "the time has come to jump over the wall of control". The government condemned the event.

Sánchez is now under permanent surveillance by Cuba's police force, which camps outside her home.

June 2010 letter to United States Congress

On Thursday, 10 June 2010, seventy-four of Cuba's dissidents signed a letter to the United States Congress in support of a bill that would lift the US travel ban for Americans wishing to visit Cuba. The signers include blogger Yoani Sanchez and hunger striker Guillermo Farinas, as well as Elizardo Sanchez, head of Cuba's most prominent human rights group and Miriam Leiva, who helped found the Damas de Blanco, or Ladies in White, a group of wives and mothers of jailed dissidents. The letter supports a bill introduced on 23 February by Rep. Collin Peterson, a Minnesota Democrat, that would bar the president from prohibiting travel to Cuba or blocking transactions required to make such trips. It also would bar the White House from stopping direct transfers between US and Cuban banks. The signers stated that:

We share the opinion that the isolation of the people of Cuba benefits the most inflexible interests of its government, while any opening serves to inform and empower the Cuban people and helps to further strengthen our civil society.

The Center for Democracy in the Americas, a Washington-based group supporting the bill, issued a press release stating that "74 of Cuba's most prominent political dissidents have endorsed the Peterson-Moran legislation to end the travel ban and expand food exports to Cuba because in their words it is good for human rights, good for alleviating hunger, and good for spreading information and showing solidarity with the Cuban people. Their letter answers every argument the pro-embargo forces use to oppose this legislation. This, itself, answers the question 'who is speaking for the Cuban people in this debate?' - those who want to send food and Americans to visit the island and stand with ordinary Cubans, or those who don't. If Cuba's best known bloggers, dissidents, hunger strikers, and other activists for human rights want this legislation enacted, what else needs be said?" The Center also hosts English as well as the Spanish version of the letter signed by the 74 dissidents.

Hunger strikes

On 3 April 1972, Pedro Luis Boitel, an imprisoned poet and dissident, declared himself on hunger strike. After 53 days on hunger strike without receiving medical assistance and receiving only liquids, he died of starvation on 25 May 1972. His last days were related by his close friend, poet Armando Valladares. He was buried in an unmarked grave in the Cólon Cemetery in Havana.

Guillermo Fariñas did a seven-month hunger strike to protest against the extensive Internet censorship in Cuba. He ended it in autumn 2006 with severe health problems, although still conscious. Reporters Without Borders awarded its cyber-freedom prize to Fariñas in 2006.

Jorge Luis García Pérez (known as Antúnez) has done hunger strikes. In 2009, following the end of his 17-year imprisonment, Antúnez, his wife Iris, and Diosiris Santana Pérez started a hunger strike to support other political prisoners. Leaders from Uruguay, Costa Rica, and Argentina declared their support for Antúnez.

Orlando Zapata Tamayo, an imprisoned activist and dissident, died while on a hunger strike for more than 80 days. Zapata went on the strike in protest against the Cuban government for having denied him the choice of wearing white dissident clothes instead of the designated prisoner uniform, as well as denouncing the living conditions of other prisoners. As part of his claim, Zapata was asking for the prisoners conditions to be comparable to those that Fidel Castro had while incarcerated after his 1953 attack against the Moncada Barracks.

In 2012, Wilmar Villar Mendoza died after a 50+ day hunger strike.

Cuban exiles

More than one million Cubans of all social classes have left the island to the United States, and to Spain, the UK, Canada, Mexico and other countries. Because leaving required exit permit and a substantial amount of money, most Cubans could never leave Cuban soil.

Many Cuban exiles have actively campaigned for a change of government in Cuba.

See also

 2021 Cuban protests
 Human rights in Cuba
 Censorship in Cuba
 Civil resistance
 Darsi Ferrer Ramírez
 Antonio Rodiles

References

External links

General links
 International Freedom of Expression Exchange – Monitoring freedom of expression in Cuba
 Human Rights Watch – Report from Human Rights Watch about Cuba
 Letter from Cuba (Independent Press from Inside and Outside Cuba) Web site in Spanish and English with articles by Cubans inside of Cuba and outside. From San Juan, Puerto Rico
 Fidel Castro: Fervent Opposition – a slideshow by Life magazine''

Opposition groups
 Free Cuba Foundation – official website
 Cuban Liberty Council – official website
 US-Cuba Democracy Pac- official website
 Cuban American National Foundation (CANF) – official website
 Proyecto Varela – official website
 Movimiento Libertario Cubano – official website

Political repression in Cuba
Resistance movements
Cuba–United States relations
20th century in Cuba
21st century in Cuba